Mark Anthony Montgomery (born June 16, 1967) is an American entrepreneur best known for co-founding echomusic, which was sold to Ticketmaster/IAC in March of 2007 for $25MM.

After selling echomusic, Montgomery went on to serve as Entrepreneur in Residence at Claritas Capital, sat on the Founding Board of the Nashville Entrepreneur Center, founded flo{thinkery}, launched Blue Chair Bay Rum. 

Currently Montgomery resides just outside Nashville with his daughter and fiancé.

Career
In 1999, Montgomery and Neil Einstman, one of his partners in ChelseaMusic, formed echomusic, LLC, a digital marketing and distribution company which aimed to facilitate direct communication between artists and fans. Clients included Kelly Clarkson, Keith Urban, Rascal Flatts, Casting Crowns, the Academy of Country Music, and the Gospel Music Channel.

In 2007, echo attracted the attention of IAC/Ticketmaster, which purchased a majority interest in echo. Montgomery left echo in 2009 to pursue other ventures.

In 2007 Mongtomery was awarded the Nashville Business Journals Entrepreneur of the Year.

In the fall of 2013, Montgomery partnered up with Middle Tennessee State University's Music Business Department to teach a class revolving around the "New Music Business" and the marriage of music and technology.  Montgomery arranged for the students to receive mentorship through The Nashville Entrepreneurship Center, where Montgomery is a current member on the Board of Directors.

References

External links
Personal website

1967 births
Living people
21st-century American businesspeople